KLZY may refer to:

 KLZY-LP, a low-power radio station (99.3 FM) licensed to serve Salina, Kansas, United States
 KQMY (FM), a radio station (102.1 FM) licensed to serve Paia, Hawaii, United States, which held the call sign KLZY from 2006 to 2013